Mehdi Chamran Save'ei (born 9 September 1941) is an Iranian architect and conservative politician who currently holds office as the chairman of the City Council of Tehran.

Early life and education
Chamran is the brother of Mostafa Chamran. They were both members of the "Red Shiism", a radical group that was founded by Mostafa in the US in 1965.

Career
Chamran served as the head of Iran's external intelligence. He was among those who contributed to the Iran's nuclear development program from the start. He was the chairman of the City Council of Tehran from 2003 to 2013. He received the most votes from the Tehrani electorate in three of the elections he was elected in, in 2003, 2006 and 2013.

A major supporter of Mahmoud Ahmadinejad during his mayorship, Chamran turned towards Mohammad Bagher Ghalibaf and his supporters during the 2006 elections, which resulted in a three-way split of the third Tehran council between the two conservative factions and reformist candidates. Comparatively, the second council only consisted of conservative members and the first council mostly of reformist members.

References

External links

1941 births
Living people
Alliance of Builders of Islamic Iran politicians
Iranian Irregular Warfare Headquarters guerrillas
Chairmen of City Council of Tehran
Popular Front of Islamic Revolution Forces politicians
Presidential advisers of Iran
Tehran Councillors 2013–2017
Tehran Councillors 2007–2013
Tehran Councillors 2003–2007